Tata Super Ace, launched by the Indian multinational automotive company Tata Motors Limited is a 1 tonne streamlined diesel mini truck. It offers a loading deck length of 2630 mm, a top speed of 125 km/h (78 mph), and a turning radius of 5.1 m. 
It is based on the design of the highly successful and acclaimed Tata Ace, India's first commercial sub one tonne four wheel mini truck, which also won the BBC Top Gear's Annual Best Commercial Vehicle Design Award, 2006.

Features

The driver cabin offers car-like interiors along with a host of other creature comforts for the driver like* :

Currently,{{when>|date=October 2021}} a Tata 475 TCIC (BSIII) IDI engine is being used for the domestic demand while the export variants come with the existing EURO compliance. This 1405-cc single overhead cam inline-four engine has three valves per cylinder and gives a maximum power of 70 hp at 4500 rpm and a maximum torque of 135.3 Nm at 2500 rpm.

A Direct Injection Common Rail DICOR engine for Super Ace has been developed and displayed. Production using this engine has already started. It offers an even better fuel economy and engine performance.

Safety

Complying with the International Safety norms, the Super Ace features:
 Collapsible Steering Column
 Broader ORVM for 3 Lane Visibility
 Load Conscious Reducing Valve for better braking at variable loads
 Semi Monocoque Structure with multiple crumple zones
 Side Impact Beams

International Market

South Africa
Tata Super Ace was launched in South Africa on 19 October 2012 creating a stir in the market previously enjoyed by the likes of Hyundai H100, Daihatsu Gran Max and Kia K2700.

Thailand

Tata Motors Thailand introduced its new 1-tonne commercial vehicle, the Tata Super ACE City Giant at the 27th Thailand International Motor Expo 2010. The product claims a 24 Hours non-stop operational capacity.

Indonesia
The company also started exporting the Super Ace to Indonesia in 2013.

Sri Lanka
DIMO Lanka is the dealer in Sri Lanka.

Super Ace LHD

Tata Motors displayed the Tata Super Ace - EURO V LHD (Left Hand Drive) version at the 11th Auto Expo in New Delhi in 2012 for developed markets. A 1.4L DICOR (Direct Injection Common Rail) engine, coupled with a 5-speed fully synchromesh gearbox powers this Super Ace.

It comes with additional safety and security features like ABS, Airbags and Immobiliser facility.

Tata Super Ace EV

The Electric powertrain version of Super Ace is expected anytime soon as there are unconfirmed reports that Tata Motors is busy building this for developed markets. Super Ace EV was first displayed at the Auto Expo in Delhi, 2012 as part of the Technology Day organized by SIAM.

Passenger variant
 
The Super Ace Bigboy is the passenger version of the Super Ace and was displayed at the 2017 MIAS show.

Notes

External links
 http://superace.tatamotors.com/
 http://www.tatasuperace.co.za/
 https://web.archive.org/web/20130904093033/http://www.tatamotors.co.th/en/acecitygiant-hlight.php

Ace
Vehicles introduced in 2009